Kalaikunda railway station is a railway station on Howrah–Nagpur–Mumbai line under Kharagpur railway division of South Eastern Railway zone. It is situated at Kharagpur in Paschim Medinipur district in the Indian state of West Bengal.

References

Railway stations in Paschim Medinipur district
Kharagpur railway division